William M. Brown (1866 – December 20, 1897), nicknamed "Big Bill", was a Major League Baseball player who played infielder from -. He played for the New York Giants, New York Giants (PL), Philadelphia Phillies, Baltimore Orioles, and Louisville Colonels.

In 1895, Brown developed a problem with his lungs. He travelled to Hawaii, southern California, and Arizona in an effort to find a climate that would be more beneficial for his health, but his efforts were unsuccessful, and he died as a result of his condition at home in San Francisco in 1897.

References

External links

1866 births
1897 deaths
Major League Baseball infielders
New York Giants (PL) players
New York Giants (NL) players
Baltimore Orioles (NL) players
Louisville Colonels players
Philadelphia Phillies players
19th-century baseball players
San Francisco Nationals players
Oakland Morans players
Vallejo (minor league baseball) players
San Francisco Metropolitans players
Oakland Colonels players
Oakland (minor league baseball) players
Wilkes-Barre Coal Barons players
Seattle Yannigans players
Seattle Rainmakers players
Deaths from lung disease